Peramachipalayam is a village near Thevur panchayat town in Sankari taluk of Salem district in the Indian state of Tamil Nadu. Its pin code number is 637 104. The main occupation is agriculture here. In this village Government school up to 5th grade is situated in front of mariamman temple.

Caste factor
Gounder caste (BC) is the dominant caste in this village.

References

Villages in Salem district